Marianne Stewart (born Annemarie Schünzel; 16 January 1922 – 1 November 1992) was a German-born American stage, film and television actress.

Early life
Stewart was born Annemarie Schünzel in Berlin, Germany on January 16, 1922 to Hanne Brinkmann and Reinhold Schünzel. In 1937, she and her father emigrated to the United States, where she attended Beverly Hills High School, graduating in 1940.

Career
On November 1, 1940, Stewart made her uncredited screen debut in MGM's Escape, her first credited appearance coming 2 years later in Valley of Hunted Men.

Stewart's Broadway debut came on October 23, 1944, when she replaced Annabella in Elia Kazan's production of Jacobowsky and the Colonel, opposite Oscar Karlweis and Louis Calhern. The following fall, Kazan cast Stewart, along with Edmund Gwenn and Montgomery Clift, in his staging of You Touched Me, Tennessee Williams' and Donald Windham's adaptation of the same-named D.H. Lawrence short story.

Stewart was married to her erstwhile leading man, Louis Calhern, from 1946 to 1955, and later to Wilbur George Dirksing until her death. Stewart died of cancer on May 10, 1992, in Los Angeles, California, at the age of 70.

Filmography

Film

Television

Notes

References

Further reading
 "European Cinema Chief in Los Angeles; Germany's Ace Director in City". Los Angeles Times. September 23, 1937.
 "Director's Daughter Spurns Screen Test". The Pittsburgh Press. July 29, 1939.
 "Lubitsch Tests Schunzel". The Hollywood Reporter. December 5, 1939.
 "Screen Society: Badminton is the Theme". The Los Angeles Times. December 1, 1940.
 "Young Actress Nearly Got Too Much Theater". The New York Herald Tribune. October 22, 1944. Pts. 1, 2 and 3.
 Schallert, Edwin. "Screen and Stage - 'Don Juan' Definitely Set for Errol Flynn". Los Angeles Times. Oct 26, 1944.
 Pollock, Arthur. "Playthings: Boy Marianne Just Wouldn't Be". The Brooklyn Daily Eagle. November 5, 1944                                                                                     
 "In Long Run Play". The New York Times. November 30, 1944.
 Henry, Bill. By the Way. Los Angeles Times. December 4, 1944.
 "Hollywoodians On Stage". New York Daily News. February 25, 1945.
 Runyon, Damon. "Mr. 'B' and his Stork Club". Hearst International Combined with Cosmopolitan. May 1947.
 Chapman, John. "'The Survivors' a Talky Western With a Message Favoring Peace". New York Daily News. January 20, 1948.
 United Press. "Calhern, Wife Deny Income Tax Evasion". The Wilmington News. March 21, 1956.
 "Actor's Estate". South China Morning Post. May 24, 1956.
 "Player Resumes Career on Stage" . Los Angeles Times. January 28, 1957.
 "UCLA Theater Group to Present Play by Eliot Jan. 19-25". San Bernardino Sun. January 7, 1960.

External links

Actresses from Berlin
1922 births
1992 deaths
20th-century American actresses
American film actresses
American stage actresses
American television actresses
Deaths from cancer in California
German emigrants to the United States